Don Luca is an Italian sitcom.

Cast
Luca Laurenti: Don Luca
Paolo Ferrari: Don Lorenzo
Marisa Merlini: Palmira  
Jacopo Sarno: Mirko
Barbara Di Bartolo: Chiara
Mavi Felli: Maddalena
Gianni Fantoni: Silvano

See also
List of Italian television series

External links
 

Italian television series
Canale 5 original programming